|}

The Cork E.B.F. Novice Chase is a Grade 3 National Hunt novice steeplechase in Ireland which is open to horses aged five years or older. 
It is run at Cork over a distance of 2 miles and 4 furlongs (4,023 metres), and it is scheduled to take place each year in late October or early November. The race has been sponsored by Paddy Power since 2014.

The race was first run in 1999 and was awarded Grade 3 status in 2010.

Records
Leading jockey  (3 wins):
 Ruby Walsh –  Golden Storm (2001), Perfect Gentleman (2014), Bamako Moriviere (2017) 

Leading trainer  (5 wins):
 Willie Mullins -  Three Rivers (1999), Perfect Gentleman (2014), Bamako Moriviere (2017), Brahma Bull (2019), El Barra (2022)

Winners

See also
 Horse racing in Ireland
 List of Irish National Hunt races

References
Racing Post:

National Hunt races in Ireland
National Hunt chases
Cork Racecourse
1999 establishments in Ireland
Recurring sporting events established in 1999